The De Tomaso P72 is an upcoming sports car manufactured by Italian automobile manufacturer De Tomaso. Based on the underpinnings of the Apollo Intensa Emozione, the car is meant to be a homage to the De Tomaso P70 prototype racing car. De Tomaso has said that the car should be available by the end of 2022.

Development history
The De Tomaso brand was acquired by Hong Kong–based IdealVentures in 2014, the same company who had acquired German automobile manufacturer Gumpert. Under the new management, work was started to revive the brand after a failed attempt in 2009. After an advertising campaign based on the company's history and some teaser videos of the new car in development under the code name "Project P", the company introduced the new sports car at the 2019 Goodwood Festival of Speed. The new car, called the P72 uses a carbon fibre monocoque chassis constructed to LMP1 standards and is based on the Apollo Intensa Emozione. Unlike the Intensa Emozione, the car is meant to be a grand tourer.

Design

Exterior

Designed by Jowyn Wong of Wyn Design, the exterior design is based on the P70 racing car and the LeMans race cars of the 1970s and combines modern elements with the classic shape. The exterior also features a top mounted exhaust system.

Interior
The interior is upholstered in diamond stitched leather, and has opulent instrumentation featuring polished copper elements, along with an open linkage gearshift lever finished in copper of the manual transmission installed in the car. The interior also has circular analogue and digital instrumentation design to recall the car interiors of the 1960s and 1970s.

Specifications 
In October 2019, De Tomaso revealed that the P72 will be powered by a 5.0 litre supercharged Ford Coyote V8 engine featuring a Roots-type supercharger manufactured by American tuning company Roush Performance. The engine is a result of a technical collaboration between both companies. The engine is mated to a 6-speed manual transmission. Power output figures were not disclosed as the engine is still in development stage.

Production

72 units of the P72 are planned to be produced. This move was made to ensure the exclusivity of the car. The car will go under homologation but De Tomaso have assured that the car will remain the same as the pre-production model shown at Goodwood.

See also
Ecurie Ecosse LM69

References

External links 

De Tomaso vehicles
Cars introduced in 2019
Rear mid-engine, rear-wheel-drive vehicles
Sports cars
Coupés
2020s cars
Retro-style automobiles